Phil Thompson is a UK producer and DJ on the Bedrock Records roster and has released many singles with them under the alias "Moonface".  His tracks have been featured on many Bedrock compilations and Global Underground compilations. He has also done remix work for Bedrock.

External links

Official Website 

Living people
Year of birth missing (living people)
Place of birth missing (living people)
British DJs